, sometimes shortened to , is a drama series that aired in Japan on Fuji TV in 2003. In English it is often called You are my only Madonna / ... and I Love Her.

Cast 
 Hideaki Takizawa as Suzuki Kyouichi
 Kyōko Hasegawa as Kataoka Surumi
 Koutaro Koizumi as Nakano Takashi
 Hitomi Shimatani as Imamura Keiko
 Manami Konishi as Shimada Rie
 Naoto Ogata as Honda Yoshitaka
 Kotaro Shiga as Prof. Tatebayashi Shingo
 Leo Morimoto as Kuramoto Shoutaro
 Miki Maya as Matsuno Shizue
 Reiko Matsuo as Shimizu Moeko
 Kazuki Kosakai as Ichigaya Sho
 Kyusaku Shimada as Oosugi Kazuma

Plot 
Kyoichi living alone for the first time comes home one day to find a girl asleep in his bed. Through the next few days he meets her again
and again eventually coming to find out he has feelings for her. But she is hiding things from him he has no idea about.

Theme song 
SEA OF LOVE by Southern All Stars

External links 
 JDorama.com
 Official Website

2003 Japanese television series debuts
2003 Japanese television series endings
Japanese drama television series
Television shows written by Yoshikazu Okada
Fuji TV dramas